Hjalmar Carl Nygaard (March 24, 1906 – July 18, 1963) was an American politician. He represented North Dakota in the United States House of Representatives as a Republican from 1961 until his death in 1963.

Background
Nygaard was born on a farm near Sharon, Steele County, North Dakota. He was one of eight children born to Carl Nygaard and Anna Karene Grimson who had relocated from Decorah, Iowa.  He attended the public schools of Sharon, Mayville State Teachers College and the University of North Dakota.

Career
Nygaard taught in the rural schools of Emmons and Steele counties from 1932 to 1935 and was engaged in the grocery and hardware businesses from 1936 to 1960.

He served as mayor of Sharon and as a member of the school board and then as member of the North Dakota House of Representatives from 1949 to 1960. He served as majority leader of that body in 1955 and 1957 and as speaker in 1959. He was a member of the National Monument Commission from 1961 to 1963.

On July 18, 1963, Nygaard entered the United States Capitol office of Dr. George W. Calver, physician to Congress, complaining of chest pains. Nygaard then died of a heart attack in Calver's office. He was buried in City Cemetery in Enderlin, North Dakota.

See also
 List of United States Congress members who died in office (1950–99)

References

External links

Anna Karene Nygaard, American Lutheran Congregation, Oslo.
North Dakota Institute for Regional Studies

1906 births
1963 deaths
University of North Dakota alumni
Mayors of places in North Dakota
School board members in North Dakota
Educators from North Dakota
Republican Party members of the North Dakota House of Representatives
American people of Norwegian descent
American Lutherans
People from Steele County, North Dakota
Businesspeople from North Dakota
Mayville State University alumni
Speakers of the North Dakota House of Representatives
Republican Party members of the United States House of Representatives from North Dakota
20th-century American politicians
20th-century American businesspeople
20th-century Lutherans